Mis adorables vecinos (Spanish for My Lovely Neighbors) is a Spanish comedy television series produced by  for Antena 3 that was originally broadcast from 11 April 2004 to 21 May 2006. It revolves around the life of a Spanish family who moves to a wealthier neighborhood and their relationship with their new neighbors.

Synopsis 
The Sánchez family are a neighborhood family who, thanks to their daughter Sheila's success as a singer, move to live in a chalet in a luxury development. There they will meet their neighbors, the Sandoval.

Cast

Sánchez Family 

Coming from the neighborhood of Usera, district of Madrid, he worked as a greengrocer and she is a hairdresser in the neighborhood until their daughter Sheila wins a television contest and attained worldwide fame, which allows them to move to a new luxury development in the outskirts of the city. The adults in the family are always lying to each other, and they usually end up finding out. The children are always doing their thing: they laugh with the Sandoval children, and they even laugh at Grandma Críspula and her entourage. They do all of this for fun.

 Mariano Sánchez (Juanjo Cucalón) He worked as a greengrocer until his daughter made him a millionaire. Sometimes, he doubts whether he prefers to be rich or poor. He is characterized by his mustache and by wearing a fanny pack everywhere. He doesn't know how to lie and ends up hurting Loli, his wife, on many occasions. He is friendly with his neighborhood friends.
 Dolores "Loli" Mingo (Paz Padilla) She is a hairdresser. She is very spontaneous. She loves being wealthy, she brags to her old friends in the neighborhood and says that the barbershop she has opened is a beauty salon, although it really is like it used to be, a neighborhood barbershop.
 Rafael "Rafa" Sánchez Mingo (Alberto Amarilla) He is the oldest son of Mariano and Loli. He is y handsome, smart and very lazy. Very soon, despite himself, he will feel a great interest in his new neighbor, Laura, the eldest daughter of the Sandovals.
 Sheila María Sánchez Mingo (Yaiza Esteve) She is the middle child and the only daughter of Mariano and Loli. She is ten years old. She is optimistic, cheerful, somewhat mischievous and enjoys living adventures. She has just known world fame and success, although she is not very aware of it.
 José Miguel "Pepe" Sánchez Mingo (Azzdine Benaji) He is the youngest son of Mariano and Loli. He is nine years old. He feels incapable of breaking any rules that adults impose on him, which makes him the ideal target for the jokes of his peers.
 Teresa de Bromujo (Tina Sainz) She is the new assistant of the Sánchez family, to whom she tries to teach the rules of education that the rich have. He considers his bosses to be somewhat ordinary and wishes to serve in a family that is not nouveau riche.
 Críspula (Isabel Osca) She is Loli's mother, left the town to settle with her daughter in her new house. She doesn't like her family, especially her son-in-law Mariano, whom she considers henpecked and lazy. She also doesn't like the neighbors, and is almost always criticizing what is going on around her.

Sandoval Family 

A wealthy family, he works as a cosmetic surgeon and she as a journalist, they live quietly and without problems in a luxury development, until the Sánchez, their new neighbors, arrive. Like the Sánchez, the adults of the Sandoval family always lie to each other; and their children try to amuse themselves by making mischief in their environment.

 Ernesto Sandoval (Francis Lorenzo) He is a doctor specializing in cosmetic surgery. He is very presumptuous and has always believed himself to be much classier than his neighbors Los Sánchez. At first, he can't stand his new neighbor Mariano, but little by little they become friends.
 Claudia Valladares Roig (Miriam Díaz-Aroca) She is a journalist who works for a prestigious magazine. She is passionate about art and history. She tries to make everything around her perfect. She quickly befriends her nice neighbor Loli, who takes advantage of her to meet famous and important people.
 Laura Sandoval Valladares (Nuria Gago) She is the oldest daughter of Ernesto and Claudia. She is a romantic and non-conformist young woman, who constantly analyzes everything around her and with a certain obsession with seeking certainty. Very soon, she will feel a great interest in her new neighbor, Rafa, the eldest son of the Sánchez.
 Beatriz Sandoval Valladares (Ariadna Castellano) He is the youngest daughter of Ernesto and Claudia and Sergio's twin sister. She considers herself the "ideal of death", and her favorite words are: "success, money and fame". She cannot be separated from her new neighbor Sheila, since she is famous, although she is publicly ashamed of her for her continued lack of class.
 Sergio Sandoval Valladares (Christian Brunet) He is the youngest son of Ernesto and Claudia and the twin brother of Beatriz. He knows how to take care of forms and show himself to others as a polite child, although deep down he is a whirlwind capable of organizing all kinds of pranks in his environment. He always manages to look innocent, and make his new neighbor Pepe look like the guilty one.
 Ivana (Celine Tyll) She is the assistant of the Sandoval family. She is a young and pretty girl, of Russian origin, who works for the family although her profession is a biologist.

Recurring cast 
 Federico Sandoval (Carlos Larrañaga) He is the ex-husband of Carmen, he is the father of Ernesto and David, the paternal grandfather of Laura, Beatriz, Sergio and Antonio and the father-in-law of Claudia. (season 2)
 Cuqui López (Mariola Fuentes) She is Loli's best friend. She opened a barbershop with Loli called LOCUMA. (seasons 3–4)
 Juan Castillo (Miguel Ángel Muñoz) Charlie's old friend, had to pretend to be married to Romeo. He studies to be a police officer. (season 4)
 Romeo Cienfuegos (Carlos Baute) Loli burned down his house, ran over him, and he had to move to the Sánchez house. He had to pretend to be married to Juan. (season 4)
 Carmen "Carmela" (María Luisa Merlo) She is the ex-wife of Federico, she is the mother of Ernesto and David, the paternal grandmother of Laura, Beatriz, Sergio and Antonio and the mother-in-law of Claudia. (seasons 1–4)
 Inocencio (Miki Nadal) He is a friend of Mariano and Ernesto. He is a worker. He was dating Cuqui. (seasons 3–4)
 Cayetano (Manuel Bandera) Loli's cousin. (season 4)
 Yessi (Nathalie Seseña) She is married to a truck driver. She is Innocent's lover. (season 4)
 Curro Sánchez (Idilio Cardoso) He is the father of Mariano, the paternal grandfather of Rafa, Sheila and Pepe and the father-in-law of Loli. (season 2)
 David Sandoval (Pedro Mari Sánchez) He is the son of Federico and Carmela, he is the brother of Ernesto, the paternal uncle of Laura, Beatriz, Sergio and Antonio and the brother-in-law of Claudia. (season 1)
 Pedro "Ponchó" Moreno (Darío Frías) He is a friend of Laura, Aitana, Rubén and Rafa. He is innocent and a good person. (seasons 1–4)
 Aitana Sagalés de Somontano (Daniela Costa) She is Laura's best friend, friend of Poncho, Rafa and Rubén. Extremely posh. (seasons 1–4)
 Christian Sotomonte Ruiz de Castro (Javier Ríos) He is Laura's ex-boyfriend. (season 2)
 Petri (Pilar Sánchez) She is a friend of the Sánchez family from the neighborhood. It is somewhat ordinary. She was married to Angelito, a friend of Mariano. Her daughter Vanessa has been involved with Rafa. The Sandovals have problems with her and are forced to hire her as an assistant. She rivals Ivana, whom she wants to kick out of the Sandoval house. (seasons 1–2)
 Angie (Erika Sanz) She is the cousin of Rafa, Sheila and Pepe. (seasons 3–4)
 Rubén (Kike Guaza) He is a friend of Laura, Aitana, Rubén and Rafa. (season 1)
 Violeta (María San Juan) She is Ernesto's goddaughter, and she spent time living with the Sandoval family. (season 4)
 Vanessa (Vanessa De Frutos) She is the daughter of Angelito and Angie. She's badass and she's full of tattoos. (seasons 1–2)
 Yiyi (Alberto Ferreiro) Rafa's friend from the neighborhood. (seasons 1–2)
 Gabi (Enrique Berrendero) Rafa's friend from the neighborhood. (seasons 1–2)

Participations 
 Alonso Caparrós 
 Chenoa 
 Miguel Ángel Silvestre
 Carlos Sobera 
 Lucía Hoyos
 Jaydy Michel 
 Javivi 
 Patricia Conde 
 Pablo Penedo
 Las Virtudes

References

External links

Spanish television sitcoms
2000s Spanish comedy television series
2004 Spanish television series debuts
2006 Spanish television series endings
Antena 3 (Spanish TV channel) network series